Busari (born 23 October 1986) is an Indonesian professional footballer who plays as a winger for Liga 3 club Serpong City.

Honours

Club
Persiba Bantul
 Indonesian Premier Division: 2010-11
PSS Sleman
 Liga 2: 2018

References

External links
 Busari at Soccerway
 Busari at Liga Indonesia

1986 births
Living people
Indonesian footballers
Persiba Bantul players
PSS Sleman players
Persibo Bojonegoro players
Persepam Madura Utama players
Persibat Batang players
Persijap Jepara players
Indonesian Premier Division players
Liga 1 (Indonesia) players
Liga 2 (Indonesia) players
Association football wingers
Sportspeople from Central Java